Eyewitness  (released in the UK as The Janitor) is a 1981 American neo-noir thriller film produced and directed by Peter Yates and written by Steve Tesich. It stars William Hurt, Sigourney Weaver, Christopher Plummer, and James Woods. The story involves a television news reporter and a janitor who team to solve a murder.

Plot 
New York City janitor Daryll Deever is an avid fan of television news reporter Toni Sokolow. A wealthy Vietnamese man suspected of criminal connections is murdered in Daryll's office building, and Toni suspects Deever knows something about it.

She keeps after him for information, a pursuit Daryll allows because he is romantically interested in Toni, and a "cat and mouse" game ensues.  This convinces the real killers that Daryll does know vital information about the murder, so he and Toni end up with their lives in danger over this false assumption.

Cast 
 William Hurt as Daryll Deever
 Sigourney Weaver as Antonia "Toni" Sokolow
 Christopher Plummer as Joseph
 James Woods as Alan “Aldo” Mercer
 Irene Worth as Mrs. Sokolow
 Kenneth McMillan as Mr. Deever
 Pamela Reed as Linda Mercer
 Albert Paulsen as Mr. Sokolow
 Steven Hill as Lt. Jacobs
 Morgan Freeman as Lt. Black
 Alice Drummond as Mrs. Eunice Deever
 Chao-Li Chi as Mr. Long
 Keone Young as Mr. Long's son

Production 
The news equipment and promotional posters actually belonged to a real television station in New York City, then-Metromedia owned independent WNEW-TV. Two then-station employees, news anchor John Roland and sportscaster Bill Mazer, made cameo appearances in the film. Sigourney Weaver, whose father Sylvester "Pat" Weaver had been a top network television executive, also worked for the station in order to gain experience. Both WNEW-TV (now Fox-owned-and-operated WNYW) and the film were under the corporate umbrella of 21st Century Fox until March 20, 2019, when Fox closed on its sale of its entertainment assets, including the film, to The Walt Disney Company.

Producer-director Peter Yates and screenwriter Steve Tesich had collaborated two years earlier on the film Breaking Away.

Hum To Mohabbat Karega, a 2000 Bollywood thriller-comedy film starring Karishma Kapoor and Bobby Deol, was inspired by Eyewitness.

References

External links 
 
 
 
 
 
 

1980s mystery thriller films
1981 films
American mystery thriller films
Films directed by Peter Yates
20th Century Fox films
Films about journalists
Films set in New York City
American neo-noir films
1980s English-language films
1980s American films